A Place Called Today is a 1972 American drama film written and directed by Don Schain. The film stars J. Herbert Kerr Jr., Lana Wood, Cheri Caffaro, Richard Smedley, Timothy Brown and Peter Carew. The film was released on June 7, 1972, by Embassy Pictures.

Plot

Cast       
J. Herbert Kerr Jr. as Randy Johnson
Lana Wood as Carolyn Schneider
Cheri Caffaro as Cindy Cartwright
Richard Smedley as Ron Carton
Timothy Brown as Steve Smith 
Peter Carew as Ben Atkinson
Woody Carter as Black Radical
Leo Tepp as Alexander Cartwright
Cucho Viera as White Radical
Howard Zeiden as Doug Gilmore
Humphrey Davis as John Higgins
Mary Rio Lewis as Mrs. Johnson

References

External links
 

1972 films
American drama films
1972 drama films
Embassy Pictures films
1970s English-language films
1970s American films